The Audio Publishers Association (APA) is the first and only not-for-profit trade organization of the audiobook industry in the United States. Its mission is to "advocate the common, collective business interests of audio publishers." Membership is open to "audio publishing companies and allied suppliers, distributors, and retailers of spoken word products and allied fields related to the production, distribution and sale of audiobooks." Activities include national consumer surveys, gathering of industry statistics, trade-show exhibits, a newsletter and an annual conference.

The APA was founded in May 1986, when five to nine audiobook publishers joined together to form the organization initially to address the need for industry statistics, such as sales and member numbers. The founders met for the first time in New Orleans at BookExpo America. They included Newman Communications, Warner Bros. Audio, Simon & Schuster, Bantam Doubleday Dell, and Random House. The first APA president was Seth Gershel who was also Simon & Schuster's director of sales.

In 1994, the APA officially established the term "audiobook" as the industry standard. In 1996, APA founded the Audie Awards, which AudioFile magazine called the "Oscars of the audiobook industry".

References

External links

1986 establishments in the United States
Audiobook companies and organizations
Trade associations based in the United States